African jazz may refer to:
 Le Grand Kallé et l'African Jazz, a Congolese band often referred to as "African Jazz"
 A style of music also known as Ethio-jazz, exemplified by Mulatu Astatke
 South African jazz, sometimes called "African jazz"